The Mali national under-17 football team is the national under-17 football team of Mali and is controlled by the Malian Football Federation. It represents Mali in international football competitions such as FIFA U-17 World Cup and Africa U-17 Cup of Nations.

Overview
The team has participated in 4 events of the FIFA U-17 World Cup and their best performance came in the 2015 World Cup held in Chile, when Mali reached finished as runners-up. Their best performance at the African level came in the 2015 and the 2017 tournament in Niger and Gabon respectively, when they finished as champions.

Tournament records

FIFA U-17 World Cup record

Africa U-17 Cup of Nations record 

*Draws include knockout matches decided on penalty kicks.

Current squad
The following players were selected to compete in the 2017 FIFA U-17 World Cup.

Head Coach:  Mamadou Traore

See also
Mali national football team
Mali national under-20 football team
Mali women's national football team

References

Mali national football team
African national under-17 association football teams